Titus Sextius Africanus was a Roman senator who was deterred by Agrippina the Younger from marrying Junia Silana. He served as a suffect consul in 59 AD. In 62 AD, he took the census in the provinces of Gaul, together with Quintus Volusius Saturninus and Marcus Trebellius Maximus. Saturninus and Africanus were rivals, and both hated Trebellius, who took advantage of their rivalry to get the better of them. Africanus is recorded attending meetings of the Fratres Arvales from 54 to 66. Titus Sextius Cornelius Africanus, who served as a consul with Trajan in 112 AD, was related to Africanus.

See also
 Sextia gens

References

Roman patricians
Suffect consuls of Imperial Rome
1st-century Romans
Africanus, Titus Sextius